Drégelypalánk is a village in Nógrád County, Hungary. It was first recorded in 1274 and was created as a merger of two settlements named Drégely and Palánk. The river Ipoly flows past the Börzsöny hills here.

The village features a primary school, a cultural centre, a library, a sports ground and a gallery.

History
Drégelypalánk has a medieval fortress that was erected by the Hont-Pázmány dynasty in the 13th century. In 1552 the fortification were defended against the advancing Turkish Army.

Drégely is recorded as the site of a church dedicated to St. Elizabeth. During the Turkish Rule, South Slavic settlers came to the area while German immigrants arrived in the 18th century.

The centuries-old economic relations to the neighbouring countries were lost after World War I.

Sights
Sights of Drégelypalánk include the late Baroque (1734) Roman Catholic church with relics of Saint Elizabeth, the Baroque chapel of St. Vendel (1857) and the ruins of Drégely Castle.

References
 Drégelypalánk's website
 Dregelypalank, Hungary Page. Falling Rain Genomics

External links 
 Drégelypalánk's website
 Szondi Tourist Center
 Drégely Castle
 Drégely Castle Foundation

Populated places in Nógrád County